The John D. O'Bryant School of Mathematics and Science (abbreviated as O'B), formerly known as Boston Technical High School is a college preparatory public exam school along with Boston Latin School and Boston Latin Academy. The O’Bryant specializes in science, technology, engineering and mathematics ("STEM") in the city of Boston, Massachusetts, and is named for one of Boston's prominent African-American educators John D. O'Bryant. The school is currently located on 55 Malcolm X Boulevard in the neighborhood of Roxbury, Massachusetts. With a student body of 1,500 7th–12th graders, this school is part of the Boston Public Schools. The school was named a 2010 Blue Ribbon School of Excellence, the US Department of Education's highest award. In 2014 the school was awarded Gold by the US News Best High School Ranking, indicating that it is one of the top public high schools in the country.

History

Now over one hundred years old, the O'Bryant began as the Mechanic Arts High School in 1893. Until the early 1970s, it was an all-boys school. In 1944, the school became Boston Technical High School. The original building containing the various shops, woodworking, machine shop, forge shop and drafting rooms was built around 1900 and was located on the corner of Dalton and Belvidere Streets in the Back Bay. The Hilton Hotel is located there today. In 1909 the five-story class room, chemistry and physics labs building was completed on Scotia Street adjacent to the older building. Later, the school moved to the building that originally housed Roxbury Memorial High School (1930 to 1960) at 205 Townsend Street in Roxbury, Massachusetts. That school building is now the home of Boston Latin Academy. Boston Technical High School remained there until 1987 when it relocated to a new building at 55 New Dudley Street (now Malcolm X Boulevard). In 1989, Boston Technical High School and Mario Umana Technical High School merged but still kept the name of Boston Technical High School. In 1994, the school graduated the first class for the school renamed after Boston educator John D. O'Bryant.

Academics
This school is a science and math specialized institution and it is one of the examination schools in the greater Boston Area. The O'Bryant is ranked #9 in the state and is the #1 Math and Science school in the city of Boston. In 2012 The O'Bryant received a gold medal by U.S News & World. It is a relatively new exam school that offers many advanced placement courses in math and science and it's a school with many excellent students. It is the most diverse of the three exam schools and it's one of the hosts of the JROTC club. Through partnerships with MIT, Northeastern University, Harvard, Microsoft, STEP Inspire, and other area businesses and institutions, the O'Bryant looks to lead science, technology, engineering, and math instruction and programming for the city of Boston. The current Head of School as of September 2022 is Patreka J. Wood.

Requirements
Admission to O'Bryant is determined by a combination of a student's score on the Independent School Entrance Examination and the student's recent grades, and is limited only to residents of the city of Boston. Although the O'Bryant runs from the 7th through the 12th grade, it only admits students into the 7th, 9th & 10th grade. Unlike the other two Boston exam schools, the day is composed of six periods instead of seven and there is no requirement to take a course of Latin. There is a requirement three years of the same language (Mandarin-Chinese, Spanish, Latin, and French) for all students who enter at seventh, ninth, and tenth grades. Unlike other public schools there is also a requirement of six years of mathematics, including a requirement to pass Calculus.

Gateway to the LMA

Gateway to the LMA (Longwood Medical Area), is a program that prepares low-income and minority students for high-level careers in medicine, science, and engineering. The gateway program involves extra instructional periods, after-school tutorials, smaller classrooms, more intermediate classes, and internships with a science-based institution. Applications are open to eighth graders, and the program runs from ninth grade until graduation. Acceptance is based on a three-question essay, regular attendance, and grades above B−.

Solar panel project

The school is home to a state-of-the-art solar energy system created by students at the school in June 2004. The 2 kW photovoltaic (PV) array, installed on the southeastern wall of the school, uses semiconductor technology to convert sunlight into pollution-free electricity. The solar equipment was donated by the MIT Space Systems Laboratory through a grant from NASA. The O'Bryant School also received support on curriculum development from the MIT Edgerton Center. Heliotronics of Hingham, MA provided a Solar Learning Lab, which gives students real-time system data on power production, efficiency, and weather conditions for analysis.

MCAS
The O'Bryant moved from not being ranked in the top 50% on MCAS in 2002 to being ranked #3 in the entire state in 2003 and 2004 for the Massachusetts Comprehensive Assessment System (MCAS) 10th Grade Mathematics. Over 98% of the students who took the test received "Advanced" or "Proficient" on the 10th grade MCAS exam, taken in the spring of 2006. The O'Bryant also ranked #8 in the entire state for the MCAS in reading & literature. Over 95% of the students who took the test received "Advanced" or "Proficient" on the 10th grade MCAS exams, taken in the spring of 2006.

College scholarships
Based on excellent performance on the 2006 MCAS, a total of 899 students in the Boston Public Schools have qualified for the John and Abigail Adams Scholarship, which provides four years of free tuition to any state university or college in Massachusetts.
To qualify for the scholarship, students had to score in the Advanced category (Level 4) on either the English Language Arts or Math sections of the MCAS exams and in at least Proficient (Level 3) on the other. Also, the students' scores had to rank in the top 25% of the district. In order to maintain the scholarship, students must complete their college program in four years or less and maintain a 3.0 grade point average.

Advanced Placement
The O'Bryant School was awarded the Siemens Award for Advanced Placement in 2003 by the Siemens Foundation. The O'Bryant offers an abundance of Advanced Placement classes such as Biology, Physics, Chemistry, Calculus, Statistics, English Literature and Composition, English Language and Composition, U.S. History, European History, Computer Science, U.S. Government & Politics and Spanish. In 2008 they added AP Environmental Science and Microeconomics.

Extracurricular activities
 
All students must maintain a 2.67 GPA (B-) or higher in order to partake in any extracurricular activities. The extra curricular activities include fall, winter and
spring sports. With its ties to colleges such as MIT, Harvard University, Microsoft & Northeastern University; the students at the O'Bryant school are offered with many programs that revolves around science, technology, engineering and math. In addition, the school has also been awarded the Lemelson-MIT Inventeams grant 2 times: first in 2006 and later in 2014. The 2014 Inventeam worked on a project to create an autonomous solar cleaner that was presented at a 3-day event in June, 2015, at MIT's Eureka Fest.

Sports
The mascot for all teams at the O'Bryant is the Tiger. Teams at the O'Bryant include Baseball, Basketball, Cheer leading, American Football, Hockey, Rowing, Football, Softball, Swimming, Tennis, Track & Field, and Volleyball. The School's colors are blue and white.

Clubs
There are a full range of clubs and programs that the school offers. Clubs include African International Club, Asian Culture Club, Chess, Drama, Dance, Step,
Haitian Culture Club, Volunteering Club, a junior chapter of the NSBE, Student Council, Talented and Gifted (TAG), National Honor Society, a Debate Team, a Math Team, Invent Team, Model United Nations, Gentlemen's society, Literary publications through 826 Boston, Environmental awareness Club, BBoy, Robot Science, a robotics team, Bio-Medical Health Club, forensics, Greentimes, Drama Club, Table Tennis, Art Club, Theatre, Key Club, Yearbook (middle and high school students), Anime club, and much more.
All students are welcomed to join any club in the school.
BOYS indoor track city champs 5 years running.
GIRLS indoor track city champs 14 years running.
Coach Ortega was the 2008 scholastic coach of the year.

John D. O'Bryant

John D. O'Bryant was born in Boston on July 15, 1931. He attended and graduated from the Boston Public Schools and went on to earning both his bachelor's and master's degrees at Boston University. O’Bryant served in the United States Army and then became a teacher and guidance counselor from 1955 to 1969, then taking a role as Director of the Health Vocational Training Program at the Dimock Community Health Center. He became the first African-American on the Boston School Board in 75 years, elected in 1977 during the tumultuous Boston busing desegregation era. He was later selected to be the vice president of Northeastern University in 1979. O’Bryant was the first African American ever to serve as vice president. He kept that position until his sudden death in 1992. During that period, he oversaw the workings of the African-American Institute and provided invaluable leadership in what were often difficult times.

Notable alumni
 Fred Ahern (Class of 1970), former National Hockey League player
 Harry Barnes (Class of 1964), NBA player
 William Bratton (Class of 1965), former Chief of Police for the LAPD, NYPD, and BPD
 Richard Egan (Class of 1953), co-founder of EMC Corporation and former United States Ambassador to Ireland
 Arthur Gajarsa (Class of 1958), federal judge in the United States Court of Appeals for the Federal Circuit
 Wayne Selden Jr. (left in 2010 after his freshman year), basketball player in the Israeli Basketball Premier League
 Dan Sullivan (Class of 1957), former National Football League player
 N.C. Wyeth (Class of 1899),  artist and illustrator
 Charles Yancey (Class of 1965), Boston City Councillor

References

External links
 John D. O'Bryant School official website
 The John D. O'Bryant Boston Tech Alumni Association

High schools in Boston
Educational institutions established in 1893
Magnet schools in Massachusetts
Public high schools in Massachusetts
Public middle schools in Massachusetts
1893 establishments in Massachusetts
Middle schools in Boston